Armed Forces Tribunal is a military tribunal in India. It was established under the Armed Forces Tribunal Act, 2007.

In 1999, the Law Commission's 169th report stated that disciplinary and service matters required quick resolutions and proposed a special tribunal for the military forces (viz. The Indian Army, The Indian Navy & The Indian Air Force) 

The Principal Bench is located at Delhi. There are ten other benches across the country.

Former Chairpersons

See also
 Judge Advocate General (India)
 Judge Advocate General's Department (India)

References

Military justice
Military of India
Military units and formations established in 2007
2007 establishments in Delhi
Indian Tribunals
Courts and tribunals established in 2007